WSIR (1490 kHz) is a commercial AM radio station broadcasting an Urban Gospel radio format. Licensed to Winter Haven, Florida, the station serves the Lakeland - Winter Haven area of Central Florida.  The station is currently owned by Anscombe Broadcasting Group, Ltd.

During the pandemic, WSIR has had economic problems and may be off the air.

References

External links

SIR
Radio stations established in 2004
Urban contemporary radio stations in the United States
2004 establishments in Florida